Kay Adams (born 27 September 1987 in Stirling) is a Scottish curler. She is left-handed.

Her younger sister Vicki Chalmers (née Vicki Adams) plays in Eve Muirhead's team.

Teams

Women's

Mixed

References

External links
 
 
 
 British Curling - History

Living people
1987 births
Curlers from Stirling
Scottish female curlers
European curling champions